New Hope, Virginia may refer to:

 New Hope, Augusta County, Virginia
 New Hope, Charles City County, Virginia

See also 
 New Hope (disambiguation)